Lake Winnepesaukah, commonly known as Lake Winnie, is an amusement park located in Rossville, Georgia, just south of Chattanooga, Tennessee. Carl and Minette Dixon opened the park to over 5,000 guests on June 1, 1925. They named it after the Native American word Winnepesaukah, meaning "bountiful waters" or "beautiful lake of the highlands". The park originally featured the largest swimming pool in the southeastern United States, which debuted in 1926 and was later removed. Its Boat Chute attraction, designed by Carl Dixon and opened in 1927, is the oldest mill chute water ride of its kind still in operation in the United States.

In its early years, the park's primary focus was on its water attractions. Later, the park began expanding its dry amusement ride offerings with the introduction of its historic carousel and well-known Cannon Ball roller coaster in the late 1960s.

History
In 1924, Carl and Minette Dixon purchased approximately  surrounding a  lake in Rossville, Georgia. They opened the park on June 1st, 1925, entertaining over 5,000 visitors with amenities for boating, fishing, and picnicking. It was named Lake Winnepesaukah in reference to a Native American word that means "bountiful waters" or "beautiful lake of the highlands". The following year, they opened a  swimming pool, the largest in the southeastern United States at the time. Carl Dixon later designed a mill chute attraction which began construction in the winter of 1926 and opened as Boat Chute in 1927. The National Amusement Park Historical Association (NAPHA) considers it the oldest operating mill chute in the United States.

In the 1940s and 1950s, several flat rides were added to the park, and in the 1960s, the first roller coasters appeared beginning with Mad Mouse in 1960 and the John C. Allen wooden roller coaster, the Cannon Ball, in 1967. In the 21st century, the park saw the addition of modern thrill rides such as the drop tower ride OH-Zone! and a compact, looping roller coaster called Fire Ball. The latest addition is the park's SoakYa water park, a  expansion that debuted in 2013.

Attractions

Lake Winnepesaukah is modeled after a classic American fair theme with a midway layout featuring food,  games, and amusement rides. The park's venue is the "Jukebox Junction," an open air theater that is used for concerts and as a playground for children. The park expanded in 2013 with the addition of a water park called Soak Ya with several water attractions. The park also featured the only known working Eyerly Fly-O-Plane attraction in the United States until it closed in 2017. Family-oriented rides include the Wacky Factory, tilt-a-whirl, matterhorn, balloon race, paratrooper, orbiter, pirate ship, scrambler, a ferris wheel, Genie, Fire Ball, bumper cars, paddle boats, a tour train, and several other family and thrill rides. In 2005, several rides from an amusement park in Panama City Beach, Florida, were brought to Lake Winnie for its 80th birthday celebration. After the revival of Miracle Strip closed down, several of its rides permanently relocated to Lake Winnespesaukah, including The Bumble Bees, The Free Whale, Kiddie Boats and The Ferris Wheel.

Other notable rides

Genie
This is a Hrubetz Super Roundup, and a favorite among guests. This ride originally sat at the front of the park, featuring a special backdrop and a rainbow paint job. In the 2002-2003 off-season, the backdrop was changed. After years of flawless operations, a storm in the 2016-2017 off-season made a tree collapse on the ride, causing extreme damage; the ride was removed and replaced by a Moser Rides Asymmetrical Maverick known as the Twister; this ride has an unusual height requirement of 57". The next season, the Genie returned with a fresh paint job and no backdrop, in the former place of the Fly-O-Plane, which was removed permanently after an accident in 2017.

Boat chute
The first ride at Lake Winnepesaukah – and still one of the most popular at the park – is the Boat Chute, which opened in 1927. According to the National Amusement Park Historical Association (NAPHA), it is the oldest Mill Chute attraction still in operation in the United States.

Carousel
The oldest ride at the park is the Philadelphia Toboggan Company carousel number 39, manufactured in 1916. Among the oldest and largest in the country, the carrousel includes 68 hand-painted steeds.

OH-ZONE!
The 2005 installation of the ride required the Fly-O-Plane to be relocated to another section of the park adjacent to the Cannon Ball roller coaster.

Zoom Flume
Once known as the Pipeline Plunge, these two water slides were refurbished before the 2016 season, receiving new tubing; the entrance was placed inside of the SoakYa Water Park and is now considered part of the water park.

Roller Coasters

Thrill Rides

Family Rides

Kiddie Rides

Incidents
On April 19, 2003, a crowd disturbance described as a "near-riot" involving 500 to 700 youths took place outside the park after management decided to close the park 90 minutes early. Catoosa County Sheriff Phil Summers claimed the incident was caused by parents leaving their children unattended at the park with little or no money, thus unable to participate in the park's activities. When sporadic fighting began in the crowd, the decision was made to close the park early, which escalated the fighting. Law enforcement agencies from Georgia and Tennessee were dispatched to the scene when the crowd began to disrupt traffic on roads surrounding the park. After the incident, the park instituted a new policy of requiring visitors under 16 years of age to be accompanied by a parent or guardian. Visitors also will be required to buy some sort of admission.

References

External links
 Lake Winnepsaukah Amusement Park

1925 establishments in Georgia (U.S. state)
Amusement parks in Georgia (U.S. state)
Tourist attractions in Catoosa County, Georgia
Philadelphia Toboggan Coasters carousels
Buildings and structures in Catoosa County, Georgia